Tarah Dorothea Probst is a Democratic member of the Pennsylvania House of Representatives, representing the 189th District since 2023.

Probst graduated from King's College with a B.A. in Communications (1992) and from Widener University's School of Law with a J.D. (2003). From 2015 to 2022, she served as mayor of Stroudsburg; as a part-time mayor, she also worked as a regional outreach coordinator at a drug and alcohol rehabilitation facility. She previously owned a restaurant with her husband and spent many years in business marketing.

In 2018, she unsuccessfully challenged Republican incumbent Mario Scavello for Pennsylvania's 40th Senate District, winning 42,396 to Scavello's 54,783. When State Representative Rosemary Brown ran to succeed the retiring Scavello in 2022, Probst ran for Brown's seat and won with 56% of the vote, defeating Republican Steve Ertle.

External links

References 

Living people
People from Monroe County, Pennsylvania
Democratic Party members of the Pennsylvania House of Representatives
21st-century American politicians
Year of birth missing (living people)